Govindachandra may refer to:

 Govindachandra (Chandra dynasty), Indian king
 Govindachandra (Gahadavala dynasty), Indian king
 Govinda Chandra Dev, Bangladeshi academic
 Govind Chandra Pande, Indian historian
 Gobinda Chandra Naskar, Indian politician
 Govind Chandra Munda, Indian politician